The Jinnah Postgraduate Medical Centre (J.P.M.C., also known as Jinnah Hospital, Karachi) is located at Rafiqui Shaheed Road in Karachi Cantonment area  of Karachi, Sindh, Pakistan. In 2015, approximately one million patients visit the hospital complex annually and it is considered one of the biggest government-operated hospitals in Karachi.

History and background

After the independence of Pakistan in 1947, the founder of the nation, Muhammad Ali Jinnah was asked for approval to lend his name to the hospital. Jinnah granted the approval with the condition that the hospital be opened to the public.

In 1952, Dow Medical College was attached with the Jinnah Central Hospital. Then after a consolidation of many departments and laboratories in the area, an updated medical institution was opened. The opening ceremony was a big event on 11 April 1959 with President of Pakistan Ayub Khan addressing the audience on the occasion.
  
In 2007, then Prime Minister of Pakistan Shaukat Aziz formally spoke at the foundation-stone laying ceremony of JPMC Medical Towers and a five-star hotel project.

See also
Sindh Medical College
Jinnah Sindh Medical University

References

External links
JPMC or Jinnah Hospital, Karachi, official website

Hospitals in Karachi
Hospital buildings completed in 1959
Universities and colleges in Karachi
Hospitals established in 1959
1959 establishments in Pakistan
Memorials to Muhammad Ali Jinnah